Ruth Barnes (born 1947) is a British art historian.

Ruth Barnes may also refer to:

Ruth Barnes (Resistance), fictional character in the V franchise
Ruth Barnes, character in Air Mail (film)